Kirchheim may refer to:

Place name

 Australia
Kirchheim was the name of Haigslea, Queensland until the first World War
 Austria
Kirchheim im Innkreis, a town in Upper Austria
 Ried-Kirchheim Airport, a private-use airport near Kirchheim im Innkreis
 France
Kirchheim, Bas-Rhin, a municipality in the Bas-Rhin department
 Germany
 , a borough of Euskirchen in North Rhine-Westphalia
Heidelberg-Kirchheim, a district of the city of Heidelberg, Baden-Württemberg
 Heidelberg-Kirchheim/Rohrbach station, a railway station
 SG Heidelberg-Kirchheim, an association football club
Kirchheim, Hesse, a municipality in Hesse
Kirchheim, Lower Franconia, a municipality in the district of Würzburg, Bavaria
Kirchheim, Thuringia, a municipality in Thuringia
Kirchheim am Neckar, a municipality in Baden-Württemberg
Kirchheim am Ries, a municipality in Baden-Württemberg
Kirchheim an der Weinstraße, a municipality in Rhineland-Palatinate
Kirchheim bei München, a municipality in Bavaria
Kirchheim in Schwaben, a municipality in the district Unterallgäu in Bavaria
Kirchheim unter Teck, a town in Baden-Württemberg
 Schloss Kirchheim (Teck), a castle
 VfL Kirchheim Knights, a professional basketball club based in Kirchheim unter Teck
 VfL Kirchheim/Teck, an association football club based in Kirchheim unter Teck
Kirchheimbolanden, a city in Rhineland-Palatinate
 , a borough of Tittmoning in Bavaria
 Slovenia
Kirchheim was the German name of the city Cerkno

Surname
 Heinrich Kirchheim (18821973), German soldier who served during both World Wars
 Raphael Kirchheim (180489), German Jewish scholar